Bill or William Fritz may refer to:

 Bill Fritz (pole vaulter) (1892–1941), American athlete who competed in the 1912 Summer Olympics
 William Fritz (athlete) (1914–1995), Canadian athlete who competed in the 1936 Summer Olympics
 William Harold Fritz (1928–2009), geologist with the Geological Survey of Canada
 William J. Fritz, American geologist

See also
 J. W. Fritz, known as Will, Dallas police officer